Irina Kotkina (born 19 September 1986) is a Russian former professional tennis player.

Biography
A right-handed player from Moscow, Kotkina was a top 10 ranked junior. At the 2004 French Open, she and Yaroslava Shvedova were runners-up in the girls' doubles, to Kateřina Böhmová and Michaëlla Krajicek.

On the professional circuit she reached a best singles ranking of 400 in the world. She featured in one WTA Tour main draw, as a wildcard at the 2006 İstanbul Cup, where she retired hurt while trailing Michaëlla Krajicek in the first round, due to an elbow injury.

In her career, Kotkina won four ITF titles, all in doubles.

ITF finals

Singles (0–4)

Doubles (4–5)

References

External links
 
 

1986 births
Living people
Russian female tennis players
Tennis players from Moscow
20th-century Russian women
21st-century Russian women